Rosemary Dunsmore (born July 13, 1952) is a Canadian TV, film, and theatre actress, director, and educator. She was awarded a Dora Mavor Moore Award for her 1982 performance in Straight Ahead/Blind Dancers. In 2009 she won the ACTRA Award for Best Actress for her performance in the film The Baby Formula. She has starred in some well-known Canadian productions, including The Campbells, Anne of Green Gables: The Sequel, Road to Avonlea, Mom P.I., Murdoch Mysteries and Orphan Black.

Life and career
Born on July 13, 1952 in  Edmonton, Alberta, Canada, Dunsmore was trained in drama at York University from which she graduated in 1973. She began her professional career in 1975 touring in Cedric Smith and George Luscombe's play Ten Lost Years. She soon appeared in productions in several important Canadian theatres, including the Stratford Festival, the Centaur Theatre. and the Saidye Bronfman Centre for the Arts. For her 1982 performance in Straight Ahead/Blind Dancers she was awarded both a Dora Mavor Moore Award and the best performer award at the Edinburgh Fringe Festival.

A prolific television actress, Dunsmore began her screen career with appearances in The Littlest Hobo in 1980. She became well known for her portrayal of Katherine Brooke in the 1987 miniseries Anne of Green Gables: The Sequel (more widely known as Anne of Avonlea outside Canada). She later appeared in the recurring role of Abigail MacEwan in Road to Avonlea (1990–1996). From 1990–1992 she starred as the central character of Sally Sullivan in two seasons of the Canadian television comedy-drama series Mom P.I.. She has guest starred on the Canadian television programs Being Erica, Degrassi: The Next Generation, Hangin' In, Lost Girl, Murdoch Mysteries, and ReGenesis.  On American television she has appeared in Beauty and the Beast ,  L.A. Law, Queer as Folk, and The Twilight Zone.  
 
In film, Dunsmore had roles in the Hollywood films Twins (1988), Total Recall (1990) and Cliffhanger (1993). In 2009, she won the ACTRA Award for Best Actress for her performance in the film The Baby Formula.

She was formerly married to actor Peter Dvorsky.

Filmography

Film

Television

Awards and nominations

References

External links

1953 births
Living people
20th-century Canadian actresses
21st-century Canadian actresses
Actresses from Edmonton
Canadian film actresses
Canadian stage actresses
Canadian television actresses
Dora Mavor Moore Award winners